Hylypnes is a genus of moths of the family Xyloryctidae. The members of the genus are found in eastern Australia, in New South Wales and Queensland.

Species
 Hylypnes isosticha (Meyrick, 1915)
 Hylypnes pudica (Lower, 1896)
 Hylypnes leptosticta (Turner, 1947)

References

Xyloryctidae
Xyloryctidae genera